Daisy Ann Peterkin (September 16, 1884 – August 12, 1952), known by the stage name Mlle. Dazie, was an American vaudeville and Ziegfeld Follies dancer at the turn of the 20th century. She was a toe-dancer.

Biography
Born on September 16, 1884 in St. Louis, Dazie's first appearance in vaudeville was as "Le Domino Rouge" in an act where she wore a red mask. After she got rid of the mask, she was billed as "Mlle. Dazie" and it was under this name that she appeared in the Ziegfeld Follies. She toured the B. F. Keith Circuit in a ballet pantomime, L'Amour d'Artiste, and headlined the Palace in 1917 in another ballet pantomime directed by Herbert Brenon. She headlined The Garden of Punchinello ballet directed by Herbert Brenon at the Palace. She also appeared in La Belle Paree. Her last stage performance was in Aphrodite, in 1919.

She married Cornelius Fellowes, president of the St. Nicholas Hygeia Ice Company and son of a famous horseman. A prize-winning racehorse (a thoroughbred mare) named after her has lineage including several successful racehorses.

She died on August 12, 1952 in Miami Beach, aged 67.

Legacy
Gladys Brockwell played Mlle. Dazie in the silent film Spangles, 1926.

Broadway
 The Belle of New York, January 22, 1900
 Ziegfeld Follies of 1907, July 8, 1907
 Ziegfeld Follies of 1908, June 15, 1908
 La Belle Paree / Bow-Sing / Tortajada, March 20, 1911
 La Belle Paree, September 11, 1911
 The Merry Countess, August 20, 1912
 Maid in America, February 18, 1915
 Aphrodite, November 24, 1919

Films
 The Black Panther's Cub, 1921

References

External links

1884 births
1952 deaths
American female dancers
Vaudeville performers
20th-century American dancers
20th-century American women